, son of regent Mitsuie, was a kugyō or Japanese court noble of the Muromachi period (1336–1573). He held a regent position kampaku from 1487 to 1488.

References
 

1439 births
1488 deaths
Fujiwara clan
Kujō family